James Van Pelt (born 1954 in Akron, Ohio) is an American science fiction author who began publishing in the mid-90s. He is also a teacher in the language arts department at Fruita Monument High School in Fruita, Colorado. He is also the former advisor of The Catalyst, the student-run monthly magazine of Fruita Monument High School.



Biography

In 1999, Van Pelt was a finalist for the John W. Campbell Award for Best New Writer. "The Last of the O-Forms" (2002), a short story, was a finalist for the Nebula Award. "The Inn at Mount Either," (2005), a short story, was a finalist for the Theodore Sturgeon Award for Best Short Story from 2005.  He has also been nominated for the Analog Anlab Reader's Award, the Asimov's Reader's Poll Award, and the Locus Poll Award.

He has had many short stories published, some of which have been re-published in his three short story collections, Strangers and Beggars, The Last of the O-Forms and Other Stories, and The Radio Magician and Other Stories.  Strangers and Beggars, the first collection, was recognized as a Best Books for Young Adults by the American Library Association. Several of his stories have been reprinted in various Best of the Year anthologies.

His first novel, Summer of the Apocalypse, was released from Fairwood Press in October 2006.

He received his B.A. from Metro State College in Denver, Colorado in 1978 and later  his M.A. from University of California at Davis in 1990. He currently lives in western Colorado, where he teaches English at Fruita Monument High School and Mesa State college

Bibliography

Novels
 Summer of the Apocalypse (Fairwood Press, Oct 2006)
 Pandora's Gun (Fairwood Press, Apr 2015)

Collections
 Strangers and Beggars (Fairwood Press, July 2002)
 The Last of the O-Forms and Other Stories (Fairwood Press, Aug 2005)
 "The Radio Magician and Other Stories" (Fairwood Press, May 2009)

Short fiction
 "Nor a Lender Be" (Analog, Feb 1999)
 "Ark Ascension" (Analog, Dec 1999)
 "The Comeback" (Analog, April 2000)
 "Friday, After the Game" (Analog, Oct 2000)
 "Resurrection" (Analog, Jan 2001)
 "What Weena Knew" (Analog, April 2001)
 "The Infodict" (Asimov's, Aug 2001)
 "The Invisible Empire" (The Children of Cthulhu, Jan 2002)
 "Perceptual Set" (Analog, Jan 2002)
 "The Safety of the Herd" (Asimov's, Jan 2002)
 "A Flock of Birds" (SCI FICTION, Aug 2002)
 "Far From the Emerald Isle" (Analog, Sep 2002)
 "The Last of the O-Forms" (Asimov's, Sep 2002) (Nebula Award finalist)
 "Sacrifice" (Paradox, Summer 2003)
 "The Long Way Home" (Asimov's, Sep 2003)
 "Echoing" (Asimov's, Dec 2004)
 "The Inn at Mount Either" (Analog, May 2005)
 "The Ice-Cream Man" (Asimov's, June 2005)
 Just Before Recess (Flash Fiction Online, Mar 2008)

External links
 James Van Pelt (Author of Summer of the Apocalypse) | Goodreads
 James Van Pelt's Home Page: Writer
 James Van Pelt's Live Journal
 "A Flock of Birds" by James Van Pelt
 "Parallel Highways" by James Van Pelt
 "The Hurt Club" by James Van Pelt
 "Placing "SFWA Member" on Your Cover Letter: Will It Help Sell Your Story?" by James Van Pelt

1954 births
Living people
21st-century American novelists
American male novelists
American science fiction writers
American male short story writers
Asimov's Science Fiction people
University of California, Davis alumni
21st-century American short story writers
21st-century American male writers